Ruggeller Riet Nature Reserve is a national nature reserve in Ruggell municipality, Liechtenstein. Located near the country's northern tripoint with Austria and Switzerland, Ruggeller Riet includes  of wet meadows and moorland in the valley of the Alpine Rhine. The reserve was designated in 1978, and it has been protected as a Ramsar site since 1991.

History
The name "Ruggeller Riet" is thought to refer to reeds that likely covered the region before the advent of intensive agriculture. The wetlands in this region of the Alpine Rhine valley began as shallow lakes formed after the melting of the Rhine Glacier some 16,500 years ago. Over time, silt deposition from the Rhine led to the development of bogs and the formation of peat. Pollen profiles show signs of human presence in the area as early as the 4th millennium BCE, and artifacts dating from the Bronze Age and Iron Age have been recovered from the peat. Since the late Middle Ages the area has been used for pasture and hay mowing by local farmers. A peat-cutting industry developed in the nineteenth century but declined after World War II.

Flora and fauna
The dominant plant species include purple moor grass, brown bog-rush, and great fen-sedge, and other common species include crested wood fern, gladiolus, and Siberian iris. The wetlands provide a stopover site supporting migratory birds, including storks.

Conservation
Ruggeller Riet was designated as a national nature reserve by the Principality of Liechtenstein in 1978. On 6 August 1991 the reserve was declared Liechtenstein's first and only Ramsar site when Liechtenstein acceded to the Ramsar Convention.

References

External links

Ramsar sites in Liechtenstein
Nature reserves in Liechtenstein
1978 establishments in Liechtenstein